In mathematics, a half-exponential function is a functional square root of an exponential function. That is, a function  such that   composed with itself results in an exponential function:

for some constants

Impossibility of a closed-form formula
If a function  is defined using the standard arithmetic operations, exponentials, logarithms, and real-valued constants, then  is either subexponential or superexponential. Thus, a Hardy -function cannot be half-exponential.

Construction
In particular, for every  in the open interval  and for every continuous strictly increasing function  from  onto , there is an extension of this function to a continuous strictly increasing function  on the real numbers such that  The function  is the unique solution to the functional equation

Application
Half-exponential functions are used in computational complexity theory for growth rates "intermediate" between polynomial and exponential.

See also

References

External links
 Does the exponential function have a (compositional) square root?
 “Closed-form” functions with half-exponential growth

Analysis of algorithms
Computational complexity theory